Marquis Gòng of Cai (蔡共侯) (?–760 BC), born as Ji Xīng (姬興), was the ninth ruler of the State of Cai from 761 BC  to 760 BC.  He was the only known son of Marquis Yi of Cai (蔡夷侯), his predecessor. His reign only lasted for 2 years, which seem reasonable since his father's reign was 48 years making him an old man by the time he became Marquis.  He was succeeded by his son.

References
Shiji

Zhou dynasty nobility
Cai (state)
760 BC deaths
8th-century BC Chinese monarchs
Year of birth unknown